Claude M. Isbell (1884–1962) was a member of the Texas legislature.
 
Isbell, a Democrat was first elected to the Texas Senate in a special election in 1935. He served in the Texas Senate until 1942. He later also served as Secretary of State of Texas.

References

1884 births
1962 deaths